SS Thomas Heyward was a Liberty ship, Maritime Commission hull number 236, built by Alabama Drydock and Shipbuilding Company at Mobile, Alabama, laid down 21 February 1942, and launched 31 May 1942. It was named for Thomas Heyward, Jr. (28 July 1746 – 6 March 1809), a signer of the United States Declaration of Independence and of the Articles of Confederation as a representative of South Carolina.

She was leased to Waterman Steamship Company and delivered on 31 July 1942. On 5 May 1946, the Thomas Heyward hit an unswept floating mine off Europe. Although damaged, the vessel made it safely back to port for repairs. The vessel was placed in the Mobile Reserve Fleet in 1949, but was reactivated in 1951 for duty during the Korean War.

After final retirement, the vessel was laid up in the James River in Virginia for a time, then was purchased by the Florida Department of Natural Resources and prepared for final disposal as an artificial reef in a Pascagoula, Mississippi salvage yard with the superstructure cut down to the first deck to meet U.S. Army Corps of Engineers specifications for artificial reef structures.

References

1942 ships
Liberty ships
Ships built in Mobile, Alabama
World War II merchant ships of the United States
Standard ship types of the United States